HD 47667 is a single star in the southern constellation of Canis Major. It is visible to the naked eye with an apparent visual magnitude of 4.832. It is moving further away with a heliocentric radial velocity of +29 km/s.

The suffix notation indicates overabundances of calcium and the cyanide molecule have been found in the spectrum of the stellar atmosphere. The star has 7.4 times the mass of the Sun and has expanded to 28 times the Sun's radius. It is radiating 2,317 times the Sun's luminosity from its enlarged photosphere at an effective temperature of 4,200 K.

References

K-type giants
Canis Majoris, 61
Canis Major
Durchmusterung objects
047667
031827
2450